The Royal New Zealand Police College (RNZPC) is the central training institution for police recruits and police officers in New Zealand. It is located at Papakowhai, approximately 2 km north of Porirua City.

Recruits at the college undergo a rigorous 16 week training course. There are around six intakes (called "wings") of recruits admitted each year. Wings consist of 40, 60 or 80 recruits. Trainees are taught a variety of skills relating to police vehicle use, firearms use, forensic techniques, negotiation and cultural awareness. Successful graduates become probationary constables for a period of two years.

As well as ongoing officer training, the RNZPC hosts other non-police related courses, conferences and events. The college is also home to the New Zealand Police Museum, and the Police Information & Communications Technology Service Centre (where information technology for the whole of Police is managed).

The Memorial Building has a wall covered with plaques dedicated to New Zealand Police Officers killed on duty.

The college was opened by Prince Charles on April 1, 1981. Prior to this, the police force's training facility was based at Trentham Military Camp.

External links

NZ Police website Recruitment information

New Zealand Police
Buildings and structures in Porirua
Vocational education in New Zealand
Education in the Wellington Region
Organisations based in New Zealand with royal patronage
Police academies